Kalsi is a famous Tribe of Tarkhan Sikhs also known as Ramgarhia Sikhs.

Notable people
Notable people with the surname, who may or may not be affiliated to the religion/clan, include:
 Ajay Kalsi, Indian entrepreneur
 Ankit Kalsi, Indian cricketer
 Harkirat Singh Kalsi, Indian road racing cyclist
 Johnny Kalsi, British musician
 Swarn Singh Kalsi
 Yashpal Singh Kalsi, Indian martial artist

References 

Surnames
Sikh names